Events in the year 1387 in Norway.

Incumbents
Monarch: Olaf IV Haakonsson (along with Margaret)

Events
The king Olav IV dies, and his mother Margaret I becomes the Queen of Norway.

Arts and literature

Births

Deaths
3 August – Olav IV of Norway, king (born 1370).

References

Norway